Klas Johan Gustaf Särner (25 December 1891 – 22 January 1980) was a Swedish gymnast who competed in the 1920 Summer Olympics. He was part of the team that won the Swedish system event.

Särner was a military officer and reached the rank of captain. Since 1935 he taught fencing at a dramatic theatre school, and in 1946 had a supporting role in the film Iris och löjtnantshjärta.

References

1891 births
1980 deaths
Swedish male artistic gymnasts
Gymnasts at the 1920 Summer Olympics
Olympic gymnasts of Sweden
Olympic gold medalists for Sweden
Olympic medalists in gymnastics
Medalists at the 1920 Summer Olympics